Caravan (pl. קראוואנים, caravanim) is an Israeli term referring to a portable building used as a living space, school classroom, synagogue, or community center.

Description
Caravanim are constructed of aluminum or other metal siding with a corrugated metal roof, and are often attached to a cement-block base. They are not insulated but can be outfitted with heating and air-conditioning units, water lines, recessed lighting, and floor tiling to function in a full-service capacity.

The establishment of caravanim on disputed land by Jewish activists is considered the first step toward the establishment of an Israeli settlement. In its initial stage of a few caravanim, the establishment is called an "outpost." As more settlers move in, the establishment is upgraded to a "settlement".

Alternately, caravanim have been established on disputed land by Israeli and Palestinian activists as a sign of protest.

Classrooms

Caravanim are popularly employed by schools — especially in Haredi neighborhoods of Israel — that are unable to finance a permanent structure. A 2008 report by the State Comptroller of Israel reported that 125 out of 186 Haredi schools in Bnei Brak, Elad and Modi'in Illit were situated wholly or partially in caravanim, some older than 15 years. The report criticized these structures for lack of ventilation, lack of bomb shelters, and lack of proper yards or playgrounds for the children. Though the construction of some caravan schools violate local planning and building laws, the government does not dismantle them.

Synagogues
Many start-up religious congregations establish their synagogues in caravanim rather than the more expensive permanent concrete-and-stone structures. Synagogues housed in caravanim are common sights at Israel army bases.

Living space
Caravanim are sometimes used as inexpensive houses in new or extensions of existing localities within Israel.

Settler housing
Most often, caravanim are employed by both settlers and the government as housing in Israeli settlement areas in the territories occupied since 1967. Residents usually live in caravanim until permanent homes are built. The caravan may also be a more permanent low-rent option, particularly for young couples.

The overnight installment of caravanim for housing is a popular means of establishing a new, unauthorized settler outpost on disputed land.

Caravillas

In 2005 prefabricated homes, named caravillas, a portmanteau of the words caravan and villa, were set up to house the Jewish families evicted from their homes in Gush Katif in the Gaza Strip as part of Israel's unilateral disengagement plan.

A caravilla is composed of several prefabricated sections that are joined on a foundation. Caravillas, which vary in size from about 650 to 1,000 square feet, are akin to the Israeli concept of a villa, or single-family home. They were instrumental in pacifying objections to the disengagement plan. The biggest of these caravilla camps was established in Nitzan, north of Ashkelon with 250 caravillas, which has grown to accommodate over 500.

See also
Mobile homes

References

External links 

United Nations: Report of the Secretary-General: Israeli settlements in the Occupied Palestinian Territory, including East Jerusalem, and the occupied Syrian Golan. September 14, 2010
Israeli Government Summary of the Opinion Concerning Unauthorized Outposts (Sasson Report). Talya Sason, March 8, 2005
Peace Now: Dror Etkes, Lara Friedman: Settlements in Focus. West Bank Outposts in 2006 - Same Song, Different Tune? January 2006
Peace Now Settlement Watch: Bypassing the Settlement Freeze. Semiannual Report on Settlement Construction, January-June 2009. August 2009
Peace Now: Outpost List

House types
Portable buildings and shelters
Buildings and structures in Israel